Paul Anthony "Tony" Wright (10 December 1925 – 6 June 1986) was an English film actor. The son of actor Hugh E. Wright, he was a Rank Organisation contract player for some years. 

In October 1956, John Davis, managing director of Rank, announced him as one of the actors under contract to Rank that Davis thought would become an international star.

He married actress Janet Munro in 1957, though the couple were divorced in 1959. He played the role of London-based private detective Slim Callaghan in several French films.

Biography
Wright's father was an actor, Hugh E. Wright, but originally Wright wanted to be a farmer. He served for two years in the Navy and then moved to South Africa where he tried chicken farming and gold mining before going into theatre.

Wright appeared in a TV version of Noel Coward's This Happy Breed (1952). He was a boxer in The Flanagan Boy (1953) for Hammer. He went to Germany with a stage show then on the way back went through France where his ability speaking fluent French helped him be cast as Slim Callaghan in Your Turn, Callaghan (1955) after the original star cast, Charles Chaplin Jnr, pulled out. 

Wright made a sequel, More Whiskey for Callaghan. He guest starred on shows like Paris Precinct, Colonel March of Scotland Yard and Sherlock Holmes.

For Rank, Wright supported Frankie Howerd in Jumping for Joy (1956). This led to a long term contract with Rank started with two Roy Ward Baker films Jacqueline (1956) and Tiger in the Smoke (1956). One writer said "he looks like being the most virile discovery for British films since Anthony Steel. And our films need his type very badly - every inch a man without being an Adonis, well built, intelligent, much travelled and with a great deal of the Kenneth More type of humour about him." Another write called him "the latest tough man 'hope' of British films."

Roy Ward Baker, who directed both films, says John Davis forced him to use Wright in Tiger in the Smoke. Baker calls Wright a "charming young man" who was "just miscast. It didn't do him any good, it probably set him back for years. "

Back in France Wright was Callaghan again in Et par ici la sortie (1957). Rank used him for Seven Thunders (1957). When he married Janet Munro, Rank's head of production Earl St John gave her away.

Wright starred in The Spaniard's Curse (1958),In the Wake of a Stranger and The House in Marsh Road. 

In May 1958 it was reported he was terminating his seven year contract with Rank because he "wasn't getting enough work". His wife Janet Munro later wrote about Wright:
He was insecure because of his acting. He wasn’t a very good actor, but he did have a magnificent physique and exciting locks. Like all Mr. Beefcakes, his time in the movies was coming to its end.  He had passed his heyday. Looks fade so quickly and I could tell he wasn't as handsome now as he was in his earlier movie. Nor was his body as supple... There was little talent to back up Tony’s looks, and I felt deep compassion for him. 
He had a support part in Broth of a Boy (1959) , The Rough and the Smooth, And the Same to You, Attempt to Kill and Faces in the Dark. He was in The Amazing Mr Callaghan in France in 1960.

In 1959 he appeared on stage in The Woman on the Star.

Selected filmography
 The Flanagan Boy (1953) - Johnny Flanagan
Your Turn, Callaghan (1955) - Slim Callaghan
 More Whiskey for Callaghan (1955) - Slim Callaghan
 Jumping for Joy (1956) - Vincent
 Jacqueline (1956) - Jack McBride
 Tiger in the Smoke (1956) - Jack Havoc
 Et par ici la sortie  (1957) - Slim Maden / Carlos
 Seven Thunders (1957) - Jim
 The Spaniard's Curse (1958) - Charlie Manton
 Broth of a Boy (1959) - Tony Randall
 In the Wake of a Stranger (1959) - Tom Cassidy
 The Rough and the Smooth (1959) - Jack
 And the Same to You (1960) - Percy 'Perce' Gibbons
 The House in Marsh Road (1960) - David Linton 
 Faces in the Dark (1960) - Clem
 Attempt to Kill (1961) - Gerry Hamilton
  (1961) - Slim Callaghan
 Journey Into Nowhere (1962) - Ricky
 The Liquidator (1965) - Flying Control
 The Man Who Haunted Himself (1970) - Man in Club (uncredited)
 The Magnificent Six and 1/2 (1971)
 Clinic Exclusive (1971) - Police Inspector
 All Coppers Are... (1972) - Police Inspector
 The Creeping Flesh (1973) - Sailor
 The Hostages (1975)
 Can I Come Too? (1979) - George Skinner

References

External links
 

1925 births
1986 deaths
English male film actors
20th-century English male actors